Aleksandr Yaroslavovich Borichevskiy (born 25 June 1970 in Murmansk) is a Russian discus thrower, who is a three-time Russian national champion in the discus event.

He finished eighth at the 1999 World Championships. His personal best throw is 65.08 metres, achieved in May 1999 in Saint Petersburg.

International competitions

References

sports-reference

1970 births
Living people
Russian male discus throwers
Olympic male discus throwers
Olympic athletes of Russia
Athletes (track and field) at the 1996 Summer Olympics
Athletes (track and field) at the 2000 Summer Olympics
Athletes (track and field) at the 2004 Summer Olympics
World Athletics Championships athletes for Russia
Russian Athletics Championships winners